Adam Hubble and John-Patrick Smith are the defending champions, but chose not to defend their title.

Seeds

Draw

References
 Main Draw

Sacramento Challenger - Doubles
Doubles